The Great Pottery Throw Down is a British television competition programme first broadcast on BBC Two from 3 November 2015. It is a contest in the style of The Great British Bake Off and The Great British Sewing Bee, but with pottery.

Format

In each episode, a group of amateur potters compete to complete two pottery challenges. In the "main make" challenge, contestants undertake a substantial multi-stage creative task: subject to given specifications, they must design a ceramic creation, build it from clay body, decorate it and they fire before presenting it to the judges for evaluation. In between stages of the main make, potters are given a "second challenge", a smaller-scale task testing a specific pottery skill, on which they are ranked from worst to best by the judges. At the end of each episode, the judges designate the best-performing contestant as "potter of the week". The contestant with the worst results is dismissed, and all others return for the following episode; the winner of the final episode is the overall winner of the series.

Broadcast history

For the first two series, the presenter was Sara Cox and the expert judges were Kate Malone and Keith Brymer Jones. Also appearing in the first three series was "kiln man Rich", Richard Miller, who acted as the show's behind-the-scenes technician.

After being cancelled by the BBC in 2018, the show returned in January 2020 with a third series on Channel 4's More4, with Brymer Jones continuing as a judge, new co-judge Sue Pryke, and Melanie Sykes as new host. A fourth series started on Channel 4 in January 2021 with Brymer Jones returning along with new host Siobhán McSweeney and Richard Miller stepping up to become a judge; Miller was replaced as kiln technician by Rose Schmits.

In July 2020, HBO Max secured the rights to distribute the show in the United States, where it premiered on 17 September 2020.

In December 2021, it was announced a fifth series would begin airing in January 2022, with Brymer Jones and Miller returning as judges, and comedian Ellie Taylor joining McSweeney as a host. The show's first Christmas special aired on 26 December 2022 and starred Jenny Eclair, James Fleet, Jamie Laing and Sunetra Sarker as contestants.

Series overview

Series 1 (2015)

Potters

Results summary 

Colour key:
 Potter was eliminated
 Potter won Pot of the Week
 Potter walked from the series
 Potter got through to the next round
 Potter was one of the least favourite
 Potter was one of the favourites
 Potter was a series finalist
 Potter was the series winner

Episodes 
 Potter was eliminated
 Potter walked from the series
 Top Potter
 Winner

Episode 1

Episode 2

Episode 3

Episode 4

Episode 5

Episode 6

Series 2 (2017)
The second series began on 2 February 2017 on BBC Two. Some episodes had a guest judge, including Emma Bridgewater (episode 1) and Johnny Vegas (episode 7).

Potters

Results summary 

 Because the judges were unable to agree, no-one was eliminated this week. As a result, two potters were eliminated the following week.

Colour key:
 Potter was eliminated
 Potter won Pot of the Week
 Potter walked from the series
 Potter got through to the next round
 Potter was one of the least favourite
 Potter was one of the favourites
 Potter was a series finalist
 Potter was the series winner

Episodes 
 Potter was eliminated
 Potter won Pot of the Week
 Winner

Episode 1

Episode 2

Episode 3

Episode 4

Episode 5

Episode 6

Episode 7

Episode 8

Series 3 (2020)
After almost a three-year hiatus, the third series began on 8 January 2020 on More4 with new judge Sue Pryke and new host Melanie Sykes.

Potters

Results summary 

Colour key:
 Potter was eliminated
 Potter won Pot of the Week
 Potter walked from the series
 Potter got through to the next round
 Potter was one of the least favourite
 Potter was one of the favourites
 Potter was a series finalist
 Potter was the series winner

Episodes 
 Potter was eliminated
 Potter won Pot of the Week
 Winner

Episode 1

Episode 2

Episode 3

Episode 4

Episode 5

Episode 6 

 Rainna injured herself during the Throw Down and was unable to complete the challenge.

Episode 7

Episode 8

Episode 9

Episode 10

Series 4 (2021)
In 2021 the series returned to the main Channel 4 network, on Sunday evenings. Broadcasts started on January 10, with Keith Brymer returning as a judge, and with Rich Miller moving from running the kilns to become the second judge. Siobhan McSweeney joined the series as the main presenter. Rose Schmits took over running the kilns.

Potters

Results summary 

 Due to the COVID-19 pandemic, filming ceased for 7 days to ensure the safety of the potters and crew. As a result, the judges decided not to eliminate anyone.

Colour key:
 Potter was eliminated
 Potter won Pot of the Week
 Potter walked from the series
 Potter got through to the next round
 Potter was one of the least favourite
 Potter was one of the favourites
 Potter was a series finalist
 Potter was the series winner

Episodes 
 Potter was eliminated
 Potter won Pot of the Week
 Winner

Episode 1

Episode 2

Episode 3

Episode 4

Episode 5

Episode 6

Episode 7

Episode 8

Episode 9

Episode 10

Series 5 (2022)

Potters

Results Summary 

Colour Key
 Potter won Pot of the Week.
 Potter was one of the judges' favourites of the week.
 Potter was safe and was through to the next week.
 Potter was one of the judges' least favourites of the week.
 Potter was eliminated.
 Potter was a finalist.
 Potter won the series.

Episodes 
 Potter was eliminated
 Potter won Pot of the Week
 Winner

Episode 1

Episode 2

Episode 3

Episode 4

Episode 5

Episode 6

Episode 7

Episode 8

Episode 9

Episode 10

Series 6 (2023)

Potters

Results Summary 

Colour Key
 Potter won Pot of the Week.
 Potter was one of the judges' favourites of the week.
 Potter was safe and was through to the next week.
 Potter was one of the judges' least favourites of the week.
 Potter was eliminated.
 Potter was a finalist.
 Potter won the series.

Episodes 
 Potter was eliminated
 Potter won Pot of the Week
 Winner

Episode 1

Episode 2

Episode 3

Episode 4

Episode 5

Episode 6

Episode 7

Episode 8

Episode 9

Episode 10

Reception

Critical response

Reviews of season 4 were mixed. The fourth season holds a Metacritic score of 60 out of 100, based on 4 reviews, indicating "mixed or average reviews". On Rotten Tomatoes, the fourth season holds an approval rating of 60% based on 5 reviews, with an average rating of 6.00/10.

Ratings

Series 1

Series 2

References

External links

2015 British television series debuts
2010s British reality television series
2020s British reality television series
Arts and crafts television series
BBC television game shows
BBC reality television shows
British television series revived after cancellation
Channel 4 reality television shows
English-language television shows
Pottery
Television series by BBC Studios
Television shows set in Staffordshire